Gerhard Martin "Gerry" Tremmel (born 16 November 1978) is a German former professional footballer who played as a goalkeeper. He works as a scout for Swansea City.

Tremmel played in the Premier League, Bundesliga, UEFA Champions League and UEFA Europa League. He was renowned for his shot stopping abilities and his reflexes.

Tremmel holds a number of goalkeeping records. At a rate of 4.2, he had the best saves per goal conceded ratio in the Premier League for the 2012–13 season. He also had the best save percentage in the Premier League that season, at 80.9%. His saves-to-shots ratio in the Premier League and on a European basis made him second only to Manuel Neuer of Bayern Munich.

Playing career

Early career
Tremmel's previous clubs include Bayern Munich and 1860 Munich, where he spent three years as a youth, before joining SpVgg Unterhaching where he made his senior debut.

Tremmel left Bavaria in 2002 for spells at Hannover 96 then Hertha BSC, where he spent 2004–05 in the reserve side. He then joined Energie Cottbus in 2006 on a two-year contract, announcing his intention to leave the club on 29 April 2010. On 7 May 2010, his transfer to Hertha for the upcoming season was confirmed, but the transfer failed and he signed for Red Bull Salzburg instead on 20 May 2010.

Swansea City
Tremmel joined Swansea City on 30 August 2011 on a free transfer following their promotion to the Premier League. Swansea manager Brendan Rodgers had brought Tremmel to South Wales and signed him after his impressive pre-season performances against Celtic and Real Betis.

Tremmel made his competitive debut for Swansea on 7 January 2012 in an FA Cup fixture at Barnsley, helping his team to a 2–4 away win. He made his Premier League debut on 26 February 2012 in a 2–0 away loss against Stoke City at the Britannia Stadium.

Tremmel made his fourth appearance for Swansea, and his first in the 2012–13 season, in a 3–1 win against Barnsley in the League Cup.

Following an injury suffered by first choice goalkeeper Michel Vorm on 27 October 2012, Tremmel started to have a run of games in the Swansea team for the first time. Swansea, now with Tremmel in the side, went on a seven-match unbeaten run that included memorable away wins at Liverpool in the League Cup, and Newcastle United and Arsenal in the Premier League. He also managed to keep clean sheets against the likes of Chelsea, Arsenal and Liverpool. These performances were met with praise from then-manager Michael Laudrup, who said, "Gerhard has done well and it is very important to know you have a goalkeeper of quality when things happen."

On 7 February 2013, Swansea announced that they had extended their contract with the Bavarian until the summer of 2015.

On 24 February 2013, Tremmel helped Swansea beat Bradford City 5–0 to win the 2012–13 League Cup by the competition's highest-ever winning margin for the final. This achievement landed Swansea's first major trophy as well as qualification for the 2013–14 UEFA Europa League. German mass tabloid Bild hailed Tremmel's "career highlight" at the "legendary" Wembley Stadium and a just reward for 15 years of hard work and professionalism in the game.

On 28 May 2015, Tremmel confirmed that he would not be renewing his contract with Swansea and would therefore be released by the club. On 11 August, however, he re-joined the side, signing a two-year contract to keep him at the club until June 2017. On 22 May 2017, the club announced his release along with seven other players after he had only appeared in the EFL Trophy during the 2016–17 season.

Werder Bremen
Tremmel was loaned out to Werder Bremen, in his native Germany, on 28 January 2016.

Post-playing career
Following his release by Swansea City at the end of 2016–17 season, Tremmel took up the position of a scout for the club.

Career statistics

Honours
Swansea City
Football League Cup: 2012–13

References

External links

 

1978 births
Living people
Footballers from Munich
German footballers
Association football goalkeepers
SpVgg Unterhaching players
Hannover 96 players
Hertha BSC players
Hertha BSC II players
FC Energie Cottbus players
FC Red Bull Salzburg players
Swansea City A.F.C. players
SV Werder Bremen players
Bundesliga players
2. Bundesliga players
Premier League players
Swansea City A.F.C. non-playing staff
German expatriate footballers
German expatriate sportspeople in Austria
Expatriate footballers in Austria
German expatriate sportspeople in Wales
Expatriate footballers in Wales